The Straight Road is a 1914 American drama silent film based upon the play by Clyde Fitch, directed by Allan Dwan, and starring Gladys Hanson, William Russell, Iva Shepard, Arthur Hoops and Lorraine Huling. It was released on November 12, 1914, by Paramount Pictures.

Cast 
Gladys Hanson as Mary 'Moll' O'Hara
William Russell as Bill Hubbell
Iva Shepard as Lazy Liz
Arthur Hoops as Douglas Aines
Lorraine Huling as Ruth Thompson

Preservation status
The film is preserved in the Library of Congress collection Packard Campus for Audio-Visual Conservation.

References

External links 
 

1914 films
1910s English-language films
Silent American drama films
1914 drama films
Paramount Pictures films
Films directed by Allan Dwan
American black-and-white films
American silent feature films
1910s American films
English-language drama films